The George Peabody Library is a library connected to the Johns Hopkins University, focused on research into the 19th century. It was formerly the Library of the Peabody Institute of music in the City of Baltimore, and is located on the Peabody campus at West Mount Vernon Place in the Mount Vernon-Belvedere historic cultural neighborhood north of downtown Baltimore, Maryland. The collections are available for use by the general public, in keeping with the Baltimorean merchant and philanthropist George Peabody's goal to create a library "for the free use of all persons who desire to consult it".

History
The George Peabody Library was funded by George Peabody (1795–1869). Peabody, having become a wealthy man in Baltimore through commerce during the 1810s and 1820s, following his brief service in the state militia defending the city against the famous British attack during the War of 1812, "gave $300,000 as a beginning sum for the Peabody Institute" in February 1857. The institute was originally planned to open in 1860, but border-state conflict in the region caused by the American Civil War delayed its establishing and construction until 1866. The first George Peabody Library librarian, John Morris, and the Library Committee, chaired by George Pendleton Kennedy, used this time to study and catalogue the collections of the greatest libraries in the U.S. and Europe. Morris then created a list of 50,000 books, and actively pursued their retrieval regardless of difficulty or expense. This practice was a great success, and was continued by the next librarian, Nathaniel Holmes Morrison. As Morrison's assistant, the scientist Philip Reese Uhler would expand this practice to scientific texts by seeking out experts in several scientific fields for advice. This form of collection development has become a standard for academic libraries.

When it opened, Peabody dedicated the first segment, the West Wing of the new Peabody Institute, to the citizens of Baltimore in appreciation of their kindness and hospitality. The institute was designed to be a cultural center for the City of Baltimore, with plans for an art gallery, music school, a public lecture series, a series of cash awards with gold medals known as "Peabody Prizes" for the top graduates of the city's then-three public high schools, as well as a public, non-circulating reference library which was later moved to the second attached segment in the East Wing in 1876–1878. 

The current library structure in the East Wing was designed by famed local architect Edmund G. Lind and opened to the public in 1878. The library remained part of the Peabody Institute until 1967, when it was transferred to the City of Baltimore and became a department in the nearby Enoch Pratt Free Library. It was transferred to The Johns Hopkins University in 1982 and became part of the Eisenhower Library's Special Collections department at the Homewood campus and part of the Sheridan Libraries at Johns Hopkins University, as the Peabody Institute itself affiliated with Hopkins.

Collection
The main collection reflects broad interests but is focused on the 19th century, in keeping with Peabody's desire for it to be "well furnished in every department of knowledge and of the most approved literature". The library's 300,000 volume collection is particularly strong in religion, British art, architecture, topography and history; American history, biography, and literature; Romance languages and literature; history of science; and geography, exploration and travel.  Some of the collections highlights include first editions by Poe, Hawthorne, Melville, and H. L. Mencken, Diderot’s 28-volume Encyclopédie, early editions of Don Quixote, Maryland and Baltimore maps, natural history folios, a first edition of Darwin’s Origin of the Species, and fore-edge books.

Building
The library interior is often regarded as one of the most beautiful libraries in the world.  Completed in 1878, it was designed by Baltimore architect Edmund G. Lind in collaboration with the first Peabody provost, Nathaniel H. Morison, that described it as a "cathedral of books".  The visually stunning, monumental neo-Greco interior features an atrium that, over an alternating black and white slab marble floor, soars 61 feet high to a latticed skylight of frosted heavy glass, surrounded by five tiers of ornamental black cast-iron balconies (produced locally by the Bartlett-Hayward Company) and gold-scalloped columns containing closely packed book stacks.  Between July 2002 and May 2004, the now historic library underwent a $1 million renovation and refurbishment.

Private events
The George Peabody Library operates as an event venue. Event fees support the library's collections, services, and programs.

Notes

External links

Historic Collection at George Peabody Library – Official Page
George Peabody Library – Official Page
Collection Highlights – Flickr Album for The George Peabody Library
George Peabody Library Private Events – Private Events Office for The George Peabody Library
Peabody Wunderkammer – Official Tumblr for the George Peabody Library

1866 establishments in Maryland
Peabody Library
Library buildings completed in 1878
Peabody Library
University and college academic libraries in the United States
Baltimore City Landmarks